Borås Municipality (Borås kommun) is a municipality in Västra Götaland County in western Sweden. Its seat is located in the city of Borås.

In 1971 the City of Borås was made a municipality (kommun) when the unitary type of local government unit was introduced in Sweden. Three years later many surrounding municipalities were amalgamated with Borås. In 1995 the western part was separated, creating Bollebygd Municipality.

In the 1990s the municipal assembly (kommunfullmäktige) decided to use the name ″Borås stad″ or ″City of Borås″ whenever possible, for the whole municipality, including rural areas. This decision is purely nominal and has no effect on the legal status of the municipality.

Localities

Aplared
Äspered
Borås (seat)
Borgstena
Bosnäs
Bredared
Dalsjöfors
Dannike
Fristad
Frufällan
Gånghester
Hedared
Kinnarumma
Målsryd
Rångedala
Rydboholm
Sandared
Sandhult
Seglora
Sjömarken
Tosseryd
Viskafors

Twin towns – sister cities

Borås is twinned with:
 Espelkamp, Germany
 Mikkeli, Finland
 Molde, Norway
 Vejle, Denmark

References

External links

Borås Municipality – Official English site

Borås
Municipalities of Västra Götaland County